La Salle Fútbol Club (usually called La Salle) was a professional football club. The club has won two First Division titles in the amateur era. The club is based in Caracas.

Honours
Primera División Venezolana: 2
Winners (2): 1952, 1955
Runner-up (4): 1950, 1953, 1956, 1957

External links
La Salle FC 

Football clubs in Venezuela
Football clubs in Caracas
Defunct football clubs in Venezuela